Pacific Century Regional Developments Limited is a Singapore-based company owned by Hong Kong's Richard Li, son of Hong Kong billionaire Li Ka Shing.

Operation

Services
PCRD Limited focus is a telecommunications services provider, as well as  sales and services activities. It is also involved in:

 investment and development of properties
 technology-related businesses (Internet and interactive multimedia services)
 computer, engineering and other technical services, and hotel operations

Locations
PCRD operates in across Asia, in the following countries:
 Singapore
 Pacific Century Regional Developments
 Hong Kong 
 PCCW
 Hong Kong Telecom
 CSL Mobile
 Netvigator
 Now TV
 Pacific Century Premium Developments Limited
 HK Television Entertainment (ViuTV)
 FWD Life Insurance Company (Bermuda) Limited
 PineBridge Investments
 Japan
 Four Seasons Hotel Tokyo at Marunouchi
 China
 Vietnam
 India

Corporate
 Chairman - Richard Li Tzar Kai
 Chief Financial Officer - Peter Anthony Allen
 Secretary - Jeslyn Heng Fook Pyng

References
 PCRD Profile of Pacific Century Regional Development Ltd from Business.com

Telecommunications companies of Singapore
Pacific Century Group
Companies listed on the Singapore Exchange